Camilla Noréen (born 16 March 1971 as Camilla Johansson) is a Swedish curler.

She is a three-time World Mixed Doubles Championship silver medallist alongside her husband Per.

In 2006 she was inducted into the Swedish Curling Hall of Fame.

Teams

Women's

Mixed

Mixed doubles

References

External links
 
 Curling World Cup 2018-19 profile (web-archive)
 

Living people
1971 births
People from Gävle
Swedish female curlers

Swedish curling champions